Ilex venezuelensis is a species of plant in the family Aquifoliaceae. It is endemic to Venezuela.

References

venezuelensis
Endemic flora of Venezuela
Near threatened flora of South America
Taxonomy articles created by Polbot
Plants described in 1952